Southfield School may refer to:

Southfield School (Brookline, MA), a private girls' school in Brookline, Massachusetts, United States
Southfield School, Kettering, a girls' secondary school in Kettering, Northamptonshire, England
Southfield Christian School, a private college-preparatory school in Southfield, Michigan, United States
Southfield High School, a high school in Southfield, Michigan, United States
Southfield-Lathrup High School, a high school in Lathrup Village, Michigan, United States

See also
Southfield Public Schools
Southfields Academy
Southfield (disambiguation)